When You Wish Upon a Chipmunk is a 1995 music album by Alvin and the Chipmunks, released by Sony Wonder, and contains 10 tracks.

The album features the Chipmunks and Chipettes singing Disney songs. A footnote on the back of the CD case stated that The Walt Disney Company neither sponsored nor endorsed the album. However, coincidentally, the home entertainment division Buena Vista Home Video (now Walt Disney Studios Home Entertainment) had released several Chipmunks cartoons on home video in the early 1990s.

Track listing
 "Hakuna Matata" (from The Lion King) - The Chipmunks
 "I've Got No Strings" (from Pinocchio) - The Chipmunks and The Chipettes
 "Friend Like Me" (from Aladdin) - The Chipmunks
 "Kiss the Girl" (from The Little Mermaid) - The Chipmunks and The Chipettes
 "Colors of the Wind" (from Pocahontas) - The Chipettes
 "Be Our Guest" (from Beauty and the Beast) - The Chipmunks and The Chipettes
 "He's a Tramp" (from Lady and the Tramp) - The Chipettes
 "The Three Caballeros" (from The Three Caballeros) - The Chipmunks
 "Under the Sea" (from The Little Mermaid) - The Chipmunks
 "When You Wish Upon a Star" (from Pinocchio) - The Chipmunks and The Chipettes

References

1995 albums
Alvin and the Chipmunks albums
Columbia Records albums